Collide is the fifth studio album by American Christian rock band Skillet. It was originally released on November 18, 2003 under Ardent Records. The album was re-released through Lava Records on May 25, 2004 with the bonus track "Open Wounds". The album peaked at No. 179 on the Billboard 200 and No. 5 on the Top Heatseekers. The album artwork is, according to John Cooper, faith and fear colliding. This is also Skillet's first full album to feature Ben Kasica on lead guitar.

Music video

A video was made for the song "Savior". The music video shows the band playing in both a house and at a park at night. It became only the second Skillet video to have a story in the video, after "Best Kept Secret", though the story in the "Savior" video is more heavily featured. The video shows an abusive father mistreating his children in the house, and the subsequent escape of the children from their father. They make their way into the park, while the location of the band playing switches from one to the other. The video ends with the children being safe in their mother's arms. Lead singer and bassist, John Cooper, has said that 'Savior' is a song written mostly about his childhood. Although he was not physically abused by his father, he had a very destructive emotional relationship with him.

Track listing

Personnel 
Credits taken from the CD liner notes.

Skillet
 John L. Cooper – lead vocals, bass guitar
 Korey Cooper – keyboards, acoustic piano, drum programming, sampling, string arrangements, backing vocals
 Ben Kasica – electric guitars, acoustic guitar, backing vocals
 Lori Peters – drums, backing vocals

Technical
 Paul Ebersold – producer (all tracks except "Fingernails" and "Open Wounds"), engineer (all tracks except "Open Wounds"), additional string arrangements
 John L. Cooper – producer ("Fingernails")
 Kevin Kadish - producer ("Open Wounds")
 Curry Weber – engineer (all tracks except "Open Wounds")
 Matt Martone – engineer (all tracks except "Open Wounds")
 Skidd Mills – engineer (all tracks except "Open Wounds"), mixing
 John Goodmanson – engineer ("Open Wounds")
 Scott Hardin – assistant engineer (all tracks except "Open Wounds")
 Ryan Wiley – assistant engineer (all tracks except "Open Wounds")
 Scott Hull – mastering
 Asterik Studio – art direction, design 
 Christiév Carothers and Everything Visual – imaging
 Margaret Malandruccolo – band photography 
 Kris McCaddon – additional photography

Charts

References

2003 albums
Skillet (band) albums
Ardent Records albums
Nu metal albums by American artists